Kyiv Civil Activists or Community asset of Kyiv (Hromadskyi aktyv Kyieva) is a bloc of political parties in the capital of Ukraine, Kyiv.

History
The coalition was founded by Oleksandr Pabat in 2005 as a non-governmental civic activist organization. During the 2008 local election the party won 5.95% of the votes and 8 seats in the Kyiv City Council. One candidate was removed from the election list in relation the possible involvement in the washing of "dirty money".

Faction leader Oleksandr Pabat is a self-nominated candidate in the 2010 Ukrainian presidential election. In 2009 Pabat initiated the Peoples' Salvation Army.

In the 2014 Kyiv local election the party did not win any seats.

Bloc at Kyiv city elections
In the 2008 local election Kyiv Civil Activists had the following composition:
Liberal Democratic Party of Ukraine
People's Party of depositors and social security
Party of Law Defense

References

Political party alliances in Ukraine
Political parties established in 2005
Political parties in Kyiv